CR-4056 is an analgesic drug candidate with a novel mechanism of action, acting as a ligand for the imidazoline receptor I2. It showed promising results in animal studies against various types of neuropathic pain, and has reached Phase II human clinical trials as a potential treatment for pain associated with osteoarthritis.

References 

Analgesics